The Lockdown Sessions is an album  by British musician Roger Waters, released on 9 December 2022 by Legacy Recordings. It compiles home recordings he made during lockdown due to the COVID-19 pandemic, later remastered for this release. The songs were previously performed in these versions during the encore of his Us + Them Tour. The album also features "Comfortably Numb 2022", a new version of the song from The Wall which opens his This Is Not a Drill concerts, as the final song. This rendition differs from the original version in its absence of guitar solos and being performed in a slower tempo, like a dirge.

Track listing 
All tracks written by Roger Waters, except Comfortably Numb 2022 written by David Gilmour and Roger Waters.

"Vera" also contains "Bring the Boys Back Home", another song from The Wall album.

Personnel 
Personnel adapted from The Lockdown Sessions press release.

 Roger Waters – vocals, guitar, piano
 Gus Seyffert – bass, synthesizer, cello, backing vocals
 Joey Waronker – drums, percussion
 Dave Kilminster – guitar, rhythm guitar
 Jonathan Wilson – guitar, harmonium, synthesizer, backing vocals
 Jon Carin – keyboards, synthesize, backing vocals
 Lucius – backing vocals
 Bo Koster – Hammond organ (except "Mother" & "Comfortably Numb 2022")
 Ian Ritchie – saxophone on "Two Suns in the Sunset"
 Shanay Johnson - vocals on "Comfortably Numb 2022"
 Amanda Belair - backing vocals on "Comfortably Numb 2022"
 Robert Walter - organ, piano on "Comfortably Numb 2022"
 Nigel Godrich - strings, backing vocals on "Comfortably Numb 2022"

References 

Roger Waters albums